Parbatthorax is a small genus of Asian sheet weavers first described by A. V. Tanasevitch in 2019.  it contains only two species: P. proiectus and P. unicornis. Its appearance resembles members of Gongylidioides and Glebala, but it can be distinguished by the unique shape of its carapace and a highly modified palpal tibia and paracymbium. The genus name is a combination of the Parbat District, where the first specimen was found, and the "thorax", whose unique shape is one of its distinguishing factors.

See also
 List of Linyphiidae species (I–P)

References

Further reading

Linyphiidae genera
Spiders of Asia